The 2022 FIG World Cup circuit in Rhythmic Gymnastics is a series of competitions officially organized and promoted by the International Gymnastics Federation.

Formats

On February 26, 2022, the International Gymnastics Federation cancelled all events scheduled to take place in Russia and Belarus due to the 2022 Russian invasion of Ukraine. The Moscow World Challenge Cup, originally planned for 19–21 August and the Minsk World Challenge Cup, originally planned for 2–4 September, were affected by this decision and removed from the FIG calendar.

Medal winners

All-around

Individual

Group

Apparatus

Hoop

Ball

Clubs

Ribbon

5 Hoops

3 Ribbons and 2 Balls

Overall medal table

See also
 2022 FIG Artistic Gymnastics World Cup series

References

2022 in gymnastics
Sports events affected by the 2022 Russian invasion of Ukraine
2022